Newcastle GAA is a Gaelic Athletic Association club located in the village of Newcastle, County Tipperary, Ireland. The club was founded in 1932 and is part of the South division of Tipperary GAA.

Achievements
South Tipperary Intermediate Football Championship (5) 1977, 1980, 1983, 1986, 1987
South Tipperary Junior A Football Championship (4) 1975, 2001, 2010, 2012
South Tipperary Junior A Hurling Championship (7) 1949, 1960, 1971, 1975, 1992, 1995, 2002
 Tipperary Under-21 C Football Championship (2) 2005, 2007
 South Tipperary Under-21 C Football Championship (3) 2004, 2005, 2007
 South Tipperary Under-21 B Hurling Championship (2) 1994, 1999 (with Marlfield)
 South Tipperary Under-21 C Hurling Championship (3) 2005, 2006, 2007
 South Tipperary Minor B Football Championship (2) 1991, 1999
 South Tipperary Minor C Football Championship (1) 1997
 Tipperary Minor B Hurling Championship (1) 1999
 South Tipperary Minor B Hurling Championship (2) 1991, 1999
 South Tipperary Minor C Hurling Championship (2) 2003, 2005

References

External links
GAA Info Website

Gaelic games clubs in County Tipperary